Anand Swarup Arya (1931-2019) was an Indian structural engineer, known for his expertise in the soil and foundation engineering and earthquake disaster management.  He is a former chairman of the Bureau of Indian Standards (BIS) Committee on Earthquake Engineering and a recipient of the United Nations Sasakawa Disaster Prevention Award of 1997. The Government of India awarded him the fourth highest civilian honour of the Padma Shri in 2002.

Biography 

Arya was born in a small Uttar Pradesh village of Ambehta in Saharanpur district on 13 June 1931 and secured his graduate degree (BE) in civil engineering and master's degree (ME) in Structural engineering (1954) from University of Roorkee (present day Indian Institute of Technology, Roorkee). Joining the University of Illinois at Urbana–Champaign in 1959, he secured a doctoral degree in 1961. He started his career as a member of faculty at the University of Roorkee where he served for 36 years till his superannuation 1989. During his career, he rose in ranks to become a professor and the head of the department of Earthquake Engineering and finally, the Pro-vice chancellor of the university. After his retirement, he was made the Emeritus Professor of the Indian Institute of Technology, Roorkee.

Legacy 
As the head of the faculty of Earthquake engineering at IIT Roorkee, Arya started many courses in the subject at the institution as well as other institutions in India and founded an interdisciplinary Department of Earthquake Engineering in the IIT. His contributions are reported in the development of new methods and structural designs suited for small and larger buildings, bridges, reservoirs and atomic power plants. He has conducted training classes in structural designing in India as well as other countries such as Yugoslavia, Japan, Thailand, Philippines, Afghanistan and Nepal.

Arya is one of the founders of the Indian Society of Earthquake Technology, along with the renowned engineer, Jai Krishna. He has guided 71 research scholars in their master's and doctoral studies. He has served as the director of the International Association of Earthquake Engineering during 1977-80 and 1980–84 and has been a consultant to United Nations agencies such as UNESCO, United Nations Human Settlements Programme (UNCHS) and United Nations Centre for Regional Development (UNCRD) as well as the World Bank. He is a former chairman of the Committee on CED 39 on Earthquake Engineering Codes of the Bureau of Indian Standards and a sitting member of the Bihar State Disaster Management Authority (BSDMA). He has been National Seismic Advisor of the United Nations Development Program (UNDP) sponsored Earthquake Vulnerability Reduction Programme and headed the National Seismic Zoning Committee. Arya has published three books, Guidelines for Earthquake Resistant Non-engineered Construction, Masonry & Timber Structures Including Earthquake Resistant Design and Earthquake Disaster Reduction : Masonry Building, Design, and Construction on structural design and earthquake resistant construction techniques. He also the founder of Anand Swaroop Arya Saraswati Vidya Mandir,  Roorkee  school. In this school he want that the students gain knowledge with Indian culture and sacraments. He has also co-authored Design of Steel Structures along with J. L. Ajmani and Response of Arches Under Earthquake Excitation with S. K. Thakkar.

Awards and honours 
Arya is an elected Fellow of the Indian National Academy of Engineering (INAE) and the Institution of Engineers (India). The Indian Institute of Technology, Roorkee awarded him the annual research award, Khosla National Award, in 1980 and he received the Jai Krishna Award of the Indian Society of Earthquake Technology in 1982. The FICCI award of the Federation of Indian Chamber of Commerce and Industry reached him in 1986, followed by the National Design Award of the Institution of Engineers (India), the next year. The United Nations honoured him with the Sasakawa Disaster Prevention Award in 1997. The Government of India included him in the 2002 Republic Day honours list for the civilian award of the Padma Shri. The National Institute of Disaster Management, an autonomous body under the Ministry of Home Affairs, awarded him the Disaster Mitigation Award in 2006.

Bibliography

See also 

 Indian Institute of Technology Roorkee

References

External links 
 

1931 births
2019 deaths
Recipients of the Padma Shri in science & engineering
People from Saharanpur district
Indian structural engineers
20th-century Indian earth scientists
Earthquake and seismic risk mitigation
Earthquake engineering
IIT Roorkee alumni
IIT Roorkee
University of Illinois Urbana-Champaign alumni
Heads of universities and colleges in India
United Nations Economic and Social Council
United Nations Development Programme officials
20th-century Indian engineers
Indian officials of the United Nations